Marcela Marcelo (1869 - March 21, 1897) was a Filipina general that fought during the Philippine Revolution against Spanish Colonial rule. She was dubbed as Selang Bagsik (Fierce Sela) for her bravery.

Personal life
Marcela was born in 1869 at Malibay, which was then part of Pariraque. She belonged to an upper class family that owns an areca nut farm. She married Quirico Lugo, a man from Aguho, Pateros, and bore him a son. As the Spanish offensive against Filipino revolutionaries escalated in the area, the people of Malibay, including Marcela, had no choice but to relocate to the Filipino controlled Cavite.

A Woman in Revolution
Marcela's husband was a member of the Katipunan and was apprehended then killed by the Spanish. When Marcela's husband was being taken away by the Spanish Guardia Civil, she quietly watched, without wailing nor protesting. Right after Quirico's capture, she entrusted her son to her sister and sought for revolutionaries to attack the Spaniards on their trenches. Marcela had been an active member of the Katipunan and was promoted to the rank of general, leading her own platoon through skirmishes. It was rare and unexpected for a woman, but as opponents saw her fight, she was hailed as Selang Bagsik.
Marcela gathered and trained young members of the Katipunan ranging from 14 to 18 years old. She also managed and organized the nursing of wounded Katipunan members in Bulacan.

Death
In 1897, Marcela died at the Battle of Pasong Santol in Dasmariñas. She led a troop to rush towards the center of the Spanish army, but the Spaniards were able to shoot Marcela in the head.

Former president Emilio Aguinaldo's private secretary, Carlos V. Ronquillo, described Marcela as:

Memorials

A bust of Marcela was built in the plaza of Malibay in memory of her. It is situated in front of the principal road, C. Jose Street.

A school is also named after Marcela: Marcela Marcelo Elementary School, which is also located in her hometown, Malibay.

References

1869 births
1897 deaths
Women in war in the Philippines
Women soldiers
Filipino women